Francestown is a census-designated place (CDP) and the main village in the town of Francestown, Hillsborough County, New Hampshire, United States. As of the 2020 census, the population of the CDP was 201, out of 1,610 in the entire town.

Geography
The CDP is in the center of the town of Francestown and extends west as far as Perley Road, north past Hiram Patch Lane, northeast to Todd Road, east past Potash Road, south to Old County Road South, and southwest to Champagne Road. The Francestown Town Hall and Academy and Town Common Historic District occupies the center of the CDP.

New Hampshire Route 136 passes through the center of the community, leading east  to New Boston and southwest  to Greenfield. New Hampshire Route 47 has its southern terminus in Francestown and leads northwest  to Bennington. Second New Hampshire Turnpike, a local road, leads southeast  to Mont Vernon.

The South Branch Piscataquog River, here a large brook, runs through the east side of the CDP and is part of the Merrimack River watershed.

Demographics

References

Census-designated places in New Hampshire
Census-designated places in Hillsborough County, New Hampshire